Cerny may refer to:

 Cerny, Essonne, a commune in the Arrondissement of Étampes in France
 Cerny (surname), etymology and people with the surname Černý or Cerny
Elvire de Cerny (1818-1899), French writer

See also 
 Czerny (disambiguation)
 Czerna (disambiguation)
 Cerney (disambiguation)
 Cernay (disambiguation)
 Cerna (disambiguation)